The Washington Examiner is a U.S. conservative news outlet which consists principally of an online/digital website with a weekly printed magazine, based in Washington, D.C. It is owned by MediaDC, a subsidiary of Clarity Media Group, which is owned by Philip Anschutz.

From 2005 to mid-2013, the Examiner published a daily tabloid-sized newspaper, distributed throughout the Washington, D.C., metro area. The newspaper focused on local news and political commentary. The local newspaper ceased publication on June 14, 2013, whereupon its content began to focus almost exclusively on national politics, from a conservative point of view, switching its print edition from a daily newspaper to an expanded print weekly magazine format.

History

The publication now known as the Washington Examiner began its life as a handful of suburban news outlets known as the Journal Newspapers, distributed not in Washington D.C. itself, but only in the suburbs of Washington: Montgomery Journal, Prince George's Journal, and Northern Virginia Journal. Philip Anschutz purchased the parent company, Journal Newspapers Inc., in October 2004. On February 1, 2005, the paper's name changed to the Washington Examiner, and it adopted a logo and format similar to those of another newspaper then owned by Anschutz, San Francisco Examiner.

The Washington Examiner became increasingly influential in conservative political circles, hiring much of the talent from The Washington Times. The website DCist wrote in March 2013: "Despite the right-wing tilt of [the Examiner's] editorial pages and sensationalist front-page headlines, it also built a reputation as one of the best local sections in D.C." The newspaper's local coverage also gained attention, including a write-up by The New York Times, for contributing to the arrest of more than 50 fugitives through a feature that each week spotlighted a different person wanted by law enforcement agencies.

In March 2013, the company announced that it would stop printing a daily edition in June and refocus on national politics. The print edition was converted to a weekly magazine, while the website was continually updated. The new format was compared to that of The Hill. In December 2018, Clarity Media announced that the magazine would become a publicly available, expanded print magazine.

On January 27, 2020, Roy Moore filed a $40 million defamation lawsuit against the Washington Examiner. Moore, former chief justice of the Alabama Supreme Court and candidate in the United States Senate special election in Alabama for the seat left open when Jeff Sessions joined the Trump administration, claimed that the magazine repeatedly wrote "fake news" attacks stemming from allegations that he made unwanted sexual and romantic advances to girls as young as fifteen when he was in his late 30s.

In January 2020, breaking news editor Jon Nicosia was fired after showing a sexually explicit video to colleagues. Nicosia denied any wrongdoing, saying he had only shared the video "because he thought it might go viral ... and become a news story." Nicosia accused managing editor Toby Harnden of abusive workplace behavior. An employee's complaint seen by CNN said that Harnden had created "toxic work environment" and a climate of "workplace terror and bullying." Editor-in-chief Hugo Gurdon then announced Harnden had departed and that he was "enlisting a third-party to conduct a thorough investigation" into the Examiner.  CNN reported, however, that "current and former Examiner employees" said that "Gurdon was aware of Harnden's brutish managing style" long before it became a public issue, without doing anything about it. 

In October 2020, the Examiner hired Greg Wilson as the new managing editor. As online editor of the Fox News website, Wilson had previously published a news story supporting the conspiracy theory about murdered Democratic aide Seth Rich and Wikileaks.

In June 2020, the Examiner published an op-ed by "Raphael Badani", a fake persona who was part of a broader network pushing propaganda for the United Arab Emirates and against Qatar, Turkey and Iran. The Daily Beast reported that Badani's  "profile photos are stolen from the blog of an unwitting San Diego startup founder" while his "LinkedIn profile, which described him as a graduate of George Washington and Georgetown, is equally fictitious."

Distribution and readership
The magazine's publisher said in 2013 that it would now seek to distribute the magazine to at least "45,000 government, public affairs, advocacy, academia and political professionals". The publisher also claimed the Examiners readership is more likely to sign a petition, contact a politician, attend a political rally, or participate in a government advocacy group than those of Roll Call, Politico, or The Hill. Its publisher claims that the Examiner has a high-earning and highly educated audience, with 26 percent holding a master's or postgraduate degree and a large percentage earning over $500,000 annually, likely to be working in executive or senior management positions.

Notable columnists and contributors

Kristen Soltis Anderson
Michael Barone
Tim Cavanaugh
David Freddoso
Quin Hillyer
Philip Klein
 Julie Mason
Larry O'Connor
Tara Palmeri
Bill Sammon
Rudy Takala
Geovanny Vicente
Byron York

Content and editorial stance
The Examiner has been described as and is widely regarded as conservative. When Anschutz first started the Examiner in its daily newspaper format, he envisioned creating a competitor to The Washington Post with a conservative editorial line. According to Politico: "When it came to the editorial page, Anschutz's instructions were explicit – he 'wanted nothing but conservative columns and conservative op-ed writers,' said one former employee."

According to the Columbia Journalism Review, among the conservative media landscape, the Examiner "is structured more or less like a mainstream newspaper—complete with clear distinctions between news reporting and commentary roles. The outlet has one of the largest newsrooms in online conservative media, with dedicated breaking news reporters and more specialized beat reporters, and a full editorial hierarchy."  According to Editor in Chief Hugo Gurdon, the paper's conservatism on the news side was largely based on story selection, citing The Daily Telegraph as an inspiration.

The Examiner endorsed John McCain in the 2008 presidential election and Adrian Fenty in the Washington, D.C. mayoral election, 2010. On December 14, 2011, the newspaper endorsed Mitt Romney for the 2012 Republican presidential nomination, publishing an editorial saying he was the only Republican who could beat Barack Obama in the general election.

Anti-immigration stories 
In January 2019, the Washington Examiner published a story with the headline, "Border rancher: 'We've found prayer rugs out here. It's unreal'". Shortly thereafter, President Donald Trump cited the story as another justification for a border wall amid the 2018–2019 federal government shutdown. The story in question cited one anonymous rancher who offered no evidence of these Muslim prayer rugs, such as photos. The story provided no elaboration on how the rancher knew the rugs in question were Muslim prayer rugs. The author of the story formerly worked as press secretary for the anti-immigration group Federation for American Immigration Reform. Stories of Muslim prayer rugs at the border are urban myths that have frequently popped up since at least 2005, but with no evidence to substantiate the claims. The Examiner never issued a clarification or retracted the story.

In April 2019, Quartz reported that White House advisor Stephen Miller had been purposely leaking information on border apprehensions and asylum seekers to the Washington Examiner so that the paper would publish stories with alarming statistics that sometimes criticized DHS Secretary Kirstjen Nielsen, which he could then show to Trump and undermine her position. Nielsen was fired in April 2019, reportedly for not being sufficiently hawkish on immigration.

Climate change 

In February 2010, the Washington Examiner published an op-ed in which Michael Barone, citing the Climatic Research Unit email controversy, argued that the scientific consensus on climate change was "propaganda" that was "based on ... shoddy and dishonest evidence." Daniel Sarewitz of Arizona State University criticized Barone, writing that Barone and other conservative sceptics were erroneously "portray[ing] deviation from scientific certainty and highly idealized notions of 'the scientific method' as evidence against climate change", which he compared to "equally naive and idealized" presentations on the other side of the debate, such as the film An Inconvenient Truth.

In 2017, the Washington Examiner editorial board supported President Trump's unilateral withdrawal from the Paris Climate Accords, which the Examiner editorial board described as: "a big flashy set of empty promises... The Earth's climate is changing, as it always has. And part of the reason it is changing is due to human activity. But those two facts are excuses neither for alarmism and reflexive, but ineffective action, nor for sacrificing sovereignty to give politicians a short-term buzz of fake virtue and green guerrillas another weapon with which to ambush democratic policymaking." 

On August 31, 2019, the Examiner published an op-ed by Patrick Michaels and Caleb Stewart Rossiter titled, "The Great Failure of the Climate Models". It claimed that overwhelmingly accepted climate models were not valid scientific tools. Scientists described the Washington Examiner op-ed as highly misleading, noting that there were numerous false assertions and cherry-picked data in the op-ed.

2022 Rejection of Donald Trump
On the day after former Trump White House aide Cassidy Hutchinson testified before the House select committee on the January 6 attack, the Examiner published an editorial entitled "Trump proven unfit for power again," writing in part:

References

External links
 
 

2005 establishments in Washington, D.C.
2013 disestablishments in Washington, D.C.
2013 establishments in Washington, D.C.
Anschutz Corporation
American conservative websites
Climate change denial
Magazines established in 2013
Magazines published in Washington, D.C.
Political magazines published in the United States
Publications disestablished in 2013
Newspapers established in 2005
Weekly magazines published in the United States